A handset is a component of a telephone that a user holds to the ear and mouth to receive audio through the receiver and speak to the remote party using the built-in transmitter. In earlier telephones, the transmitter was mounted directly on the telephone itself, which was attached to a wall at a convenient height or placed on a desk or table. Until the advent of the cordless telephone, the handset was usually wired to the base unit, typically by a flexible tinsel wire cord.

The handset of a cordless telephone contains a radio transceiver which relays communication via a base station that is wired to the telephone line. A mobile phone does not require a base station and communicates directly with a cell site in designated frequency bands.

Handset symbol 

A graphic symbol that designates a handset is used on cordless and mobile phones to specify placing or ending a telephone call. Usually a button with green upright (off-hook) handset icon  is used for starting a call, and a red lying-down (on-hook) handset  is used for ending a call. Unicode provides the  symbol.

See also
Headset (audio)
Western Electric hand telephone sets

References

Telephony equipment